Malkotsis was the trade name for Technica S. Malkotsis A.E., which has historically been the most important Greek engine manufacturer, surpassing several engine (mostly diesel and semi-diesel) manufacturers that flourished in Greece in the 1920s and (mostly) 1930s, like Dimadis-Kanakis in Volos, Peteinaris in Kalamata, Sideris, BIO, and others in Athens, etc. Located in Piraeus, before World War II Malkotsis produced various types of industrial machinery.  After the war it produced industrial machinery for several Greek companies, but it progressively focused almost entirely on diesel engines, soon becoming the largest company in its field. Malkotsis engines found use in a variety of industrial applications, while its boat engine models became legendary for their reliability. A series of electric motors was produced as well. Its EM Diesel series (designed in collaboration with a British consulting firm) included engines specifically designed for powering of vehicles and was employed in Malkotsis's own farm tractor models (Malkotsis EM-2 and EM-4) introduced in 1959. The tractors were produced for only a few years, due to lack of funding and other problems related to a complete lack of state support.  The company faced financial problems later, due to competition from cheaper imports, and was acquired in 1991 by Drakos-Polemis A.E., a pump manufacturing company which used all Malkotsis infrastructure for its production purposes.

See also
 List of former tractor manufacturers
 List of tractor manufacturers

References
 L.S. Skartsis and G.A. Avramidis, "Made in Greece", Typorama, Patras, Greece (2003)  (republished by the University of Patras Science Park, 2007).  
L.S. Skartsis, "Greek Vehicle & Machine Manufacturers 1800 to present: A Pictorial History", Marathon (2012)  (eBook)
 E. Roupa and E. Hekimoglou, “I istoria tou aftokinitou stin Ellada (History of automobile in Greece)”, Kerkyra - Economia publishing, Athens (2009) 
Agricultural machinery manufacturers of Greece
Engine manufacturers of Greece
Tractor manufacturers of Greece
Motor vehicle engine manufacturers
1991 disestablishments in Greece